Bessemer is a German occupational surname for a broom maker (besem meaning broom in Middle High German). It may refer to the following notable people:
Anthony Bessemer (1758–1836 or after 1840), British engineer and industrialist
Auriel Bessemer (1909–1986), American painter
Henry Bessemer, (1813–1898), English inventor of the Bessemer process
H. W. Bessemer, (1865–1956), British philatelist
Leonard Bessemer Pfeil (1898–1969), British metallurgist

See also
Bazemore (surname)

References

German-language surnames